The Avatar: The Last Airbender franchise takes place in a fantasy world inspired by Asian culture. This world is made up of four nations based on the four classical elements: the Air Nomads, the Earth Kingdom, the Fire Nation, and the Water Tribes. A fifth nation, the United Republic of Nations, is introduced in Legend of Korra.

Series creators Michael Dante DiMartino and Bryan Konietzko drew from historical Asian cultures to develop a tone and style for the franchise's world. China is the predominant influence of the fantasy world, though Japan, Tibet, India, and the Americas were also incorporated. Many characters in the world of Avatar have the ability to "bend", or to psychokinetically manipulate the element associated with their nationality. One individual, the Avatar, is able to bend all four elements. Avatar: The Last Airbender takes place 99 years after the Fire Nation carried out a genocide against the Air Nomads.

The Air Nomads are based on the monastic society of Tibetan Buddhism, and the Air Nomads' conception of the Avatar is reminiscent of how Tibetan Buddhists perceive the Bodhisattva. Aspects of Hinduism are also incorporated into the beliefs of the Air Nomads, including chakras and mudras. The Earth Kingdom is an expansive nation that incorporates several real-world cultures, most notably Ming dynasty and Qing dynasty China. Ba Sing Se, the capital city of the Earth Kingdom, is based on Beijing and the Forbidden City. Kyoshi Island of the Earth Kingdom resembles feudal Japan, with the resident Kyoshi Warriors donning uniforms based on those used in kabuki theater. The Fire Nation is influenced by China, while its military draws from the Imperial Japanese military. The Water Tribes are based on circumpolar peoples such as the Inuit.

The world-building of Avatar: The Last Airbender has been positively received. Nicole Clark of Vice Media favorably compared the world of Avatar to the world of Harry Potter and to Middle-earth of Lord of the Rings. Christopher Mahon of Clarkesworld Magazine praised the world's evolution between Avatar: The Last Airbender and The Legend of Korra.

References 

Avatar: The Last Airbender
Fantasy worlds
Fictional elements introduced in 2005